Ferdinando Bonsignore (10 June 1760, in Turin – 27 June 1843, in Turin) was an Italian architect and designer.

Biography
He was a student of the Accademia di Pittura e Scultura di Torino in 1782, and from 1783–1798 he was given a scholarship to Rome by the King of Sardinia. In Rome he worked with Nicola Giansimoni (1727-1800), a neoclassic architect. In 1798, he returned to Turin and was nominated architect and designer to the court.  He became professor of architecture in the Ecole spéciale d’architecture dell’Académie des Sciences, Littérature et Beaux Arts (1802–03) and at the University in 1805. In 1813 he received a gold medal for his design of a Monument to Napoleon on the Moncenisio. He kept his university position after the restoration, as well as numerous other awards and appointments. He helped design the church of Gran Madre di Dio in Turin. One of his pupils was Luigi Canina

Among his designs that were never realized were for an armory in Turin, a Palazzo dei Conservatori, an octagonal temple dedicated to the marquis Niccolò Puccini, and an Egyptian-style tomb for Michelangelo. Among his works by city are:

Alessandria, modification of façade for city hall.
Crescentino, façade for parish church.
Florence, Hall of Palazzo Pitti, 1794–95; Design of a theater for a contest sponsored by the Academy of Florence, 1794.
Naples, Church of San Francesco da Paola, never built.
Porto Maurizio (Province of Imperia), Piazza 1809.
Racconigi, Belvedere Tower and monument to the Battle of Trocadero in the park of Castello Reale, 1823.
Romano Canavese, parish church never built. 1820.
Strambino, parish church, Rosary Chapel.
Vicoforte, Façade of Sanctuary 1825–1829 (along with work by Virginio Bordino).

Works in Turin

Civic Tower, Project, project, 1801
Teatro Regio, reconstructions with Carlo Randoni, 1801
Triumphal arch in Rroyal gardens, 1801
Urban plan for Turin (con Michel Angelo Boyer e Lorenzo Lombardi), 1802
Forni pubblici di Borgo Dora, 1802
Arch in honor of Napoleon, 1805; Ponte sul Po, never built, 1805
Palazzo dell’Università, Illumination for the Passage of Napoleone, 1808
Piano d’abbellimento della città (con Giuseppe Cardone, Claude-Joseph La Ramée Pertinchamp, Lorenzo Lombardi, Carlo Randoni), 1809
Padiglione with triumphal arch for Piazzetta Reale, 1814
Palazzo di città, decoration of the stairs and hall of marbles, 1816–1825
Urban plans for expansion (with Benedetto Brunati, Giuseppe Cardone, Lorenzo Lombardi e Ignazio Michelotti), 1817
Ring of City walls, 1817
Gran Madre di Dio, Turin, 1818–1831 with piazza in front.
Via Po, collegamento of the north porticos, 1819
Santa Cristina, main altar, 1819–1822 (removed)
Piano regolatore di Porta Nuova (with L. Lombardi e C.Randoni), 1822–23
Civic Tower, second project, 1822–1823
San Lorenzo, Turin, strengthening cupola, 1823
Palazzo Balbiano di Viale, 1823
Palazzo of the Academy of Sciences, enlargement with Egyptian museum, project, 1824
Teatro Carignano, internal design (with Fabrizio Sevesi), 1824
Santissima Annunziata, Turin, study for the façade on via Po, 1824 (completed by Luigi Vigitello) (destroyed)
Piazza Vittorio Emanuele I (ora Vittorio Veneto), project (with B. Brunati, L. Lombardi, I. Michelotti, C. Randoni), completed independently by Giuseppe Frizzi (1824–25).

References 

1760 births
1843 deaths
19th-century Italian architects
18th-century Italian architects
Architects from Turin
Academic staff of the University of Turin
Recipients of the Royal Gold Medal